Ikbal was the title given to the imperial consort of the sultan of the Ottoman Empire, who came below the rank of kadın.

Etymology
The word  () is an Arabic word, which means good fortune, or lucky. Historians have translated it either 'fortunate one' or 'favorite'.

Ranks and titles
An  was a titled consort, and recognised as such by the sultan. The number of s varied.

Status

Eighteenth century
The rank first appeared toward the end of the seventeenth century, during the reign of Sultan Mustafa II (reigned 1695 — 1703). Two eighteenth century sultans Mahmud I (reigned 1730 — 1754), and Mustafa III (reigned 1757 — 1773), also had s. 

However, in the eighteenth century, the s held the title kalfa which means 'assistant master, mistress'. This suggests that at that time they were eligible for both kinds of high level harem career. In the nineteenth century the term  appears to have been used exclusively for members of the household staff. 

In the eighteenth century, the s had personal servants, and were paid 250  every three months.

Nineteenth century
This tradition of taking s continued until the nineteenth century. The s were chosen from among the s. Each  had her "night turn". Their stipend was 20,000 . They had personal servants. As clothing reflected a woman's positions in the harem hierarchy, the s wore rich fabrics and in winter they wore stuffed dresses, which was indicative of their high status. 

Each  resided in her own apartment, or sometimes isolated kiosks. In the nineteenth century, they had two rooms on the second floor of the palace, one facing the Bosphorus Strait and serving as a saloon, and the other facing the palace gardens and serving as a bedroom. The sultans came to visit an  namely if she was sick or if she had children.

She could only take the position of the s if one of the s had died or was divorced. If a vacancy arose among the s, the senior  was moved up to  status. Upon the death of a sultan, any of his s who had either not borne a child or who had borne a child who had then died, was married to a statesman. The others retired to the Old Palace.

The s were subjected to the same law of inheritance as the other women in the harem. However, they were usually buried in places of honour.

Honorific
Imperial consorts who were traditionally addressed as  include:
Nükhetsezâ Hanım (1827–1850), wife of sultan Abdulmejid I
Navekmisal Hanım (1827–1854), wife of sultan Abdulmejid I
Şayeste Hanım (1836–1912), wife of sultan Abdulmejid I
Serfiraz Hanım (1837–1905), wife of sultan Abdulmejid I
Müşfika Kadın (1867–1961), wife of sultan Abdul Hamid II
Peyveste Hanım (1873–1943), wife of sultan Abdul Hamid II
Fatma Pesend Hanım (1876–1928), wife of sultan Abdul Hamid II
Behice Hanım (1882–1969), wife of sultan Abdul Hamid II
Nevvare Hanım (1901–1992), wife of sultan Mehmed VI
Nevzad Hanım (1902–1992), wife of sultan Mehmed VI

See also 
 List of Ottoman titles and appellations
 Hatun
 Haseki Sultan
 Kadın (title)
 Valide Sultan
 Cariye

References

Sources
 
 
 
 
 

Ottoman titles
Concubines of the Ottoman Empire
Ottoman imperial harem
Slavery in the Ottoman Empire